Överum is a locality in Västervik Municipality, Kalmar County, Sweden with 1,203 inhabitants in 2010.

References 

Populated places in Kalmar County
Populated places in Västervik Municipality